Staßfurt was a Verwaltungsgemeinschaft ("collective municipality") in the Salzlandkreis district, in Saxony-Anhalt, Germany. The seat of the Verwaltungsgemeinschaft was in Staßfurt. It was disbanded on 1 January 2010.

The Verwaltungsgemeinschaft Staßfurt consisted of the following municipalities:

 Amesdorf 
 Staßfurt

References

Former Verwaltungsgemeinschaften in Saxony-Anhalt